William Condon may refer to:

 William Condon (pirate), 18th-century English pirate
 William F. Condon (1897–1972), American politician from New York
 William H. Condon (1843–?), American politician from Illinois
 William Joseph Condon (1895–1967), American prelate of the Roman Catholic Church
 William S. Condon, researcher into human interactions
 Bill Condon (born 1955), American screenwriter and director
 Bill Condon (footballer) (1901–1963), Australian rules footballer for South Melbourne